Governor Dillingham may refer to:

Paul Dillingham (1799–1891), 29th Governor of Vermont
William P. Dillingham (1843–1923), 42nd Governor of Vermont